Les jeux sont faits, known in English as The Chips are Down, is a 1947 French fantasy film directed by Jean Delannoy, based on the screenplay of the same name by French philosopher Jean-Paul Sartre. It was entered into the 1947 Cannes Film Festival.

Plot

In a country very similar to France under German military occupation, two people are murdered at the same moment. Ève is poisoned by her influential husband, who wants her money and her naïve younger sister, Lucette. Pierre, a worker and a leader of the resistance, is shot by an informer. Meeting in the afterlife, the two fall in love. As they were fated to do so, but prevented by others, they are granted 24 hours back on earth. Their first mission is to do a favour to a dead man who was worried about his young daughter. Then, after brief sex, they address unfinished business. Ève confronts her evil husband and tries to convince her sister of his treachery. Pierre goes to a meeting of resisters and tries to convince them that their organisation is compromised by traitors. The 24 hours are up and most of the time was spent not on enjoying and deepening their relationship, which was often edgy, but on efforts to help others. Back in the afterlife they agree to part.

Cast
 Micheline Presle as Eve Charlier
 Marcello Pagliero as Pierre Dumaine
 Marguerite Moreno as La dame de l'au-delà
 Charles Dullin as Le marquis
 Fernand Fabre as André Charlier
 Jacques Erwin as Jean Aguerra
 Colette Ripert as Lucette
 Marcel Mouloudji as Lucien Derjeu
 Guy Decomble as Poulain
 Howard Vernon as Le chef milicien
 Jim Gérald as Renaudel
 Renaud Mary as Un milicien
 André Carnège as Le ministre de la justice
 Andrée Ducret as Madame Astin
 Robert Dalban as Georges

References

External links

1947 films
1940s fantasy films
1940s French-language films
French fantasy films
French black-and-white films
Films directed by Jean Delannoy
1940s French films